Loveland is a surname. Notable people with the surname include:

Albert J. Loveland (1893–1961), Under-Secretary of Agriculture under Harry S. Truman and the Iowa candidate in the 1950 United States Senate elections
Donald W. Loveland, coauthor of the DPLL algorithm
Ian Loveland (born 1983), American mixed martial arts fighter
Ralph A. Loveland (1819–1899), New York politician, and Michigan lumberman
William A. H. Loveland (1826–1894)